Mindaugas Katelynas (born 16 May 1983) is a Lithuanian professional basketball player.

Playing career
Born in Alytus, Lithuanian SSR, Soviet Union, Katelynas grew up with Alytus youth basketball team. In 2001, he accepted a scholarship at the United States's College of Eastern Utah, which participated in NJCAA tournaments. Two years later, he moved to Tennessee-Chattanooga of NCAA's Division I. While at Chattanooga, Katelynas won the NCAA dunk contest in 2005. After two impressive seasons, Katelynas participated in the 2005 NBA Draft camp, but did not go on to the actual draft. He tried his luck again in the NBA by participating in Phoenix Suns summer camp, but he did not receive much acclaim. After such setbacks, Katelynas left for Europe.

He arrived to NGC Cantu for the 2005–06 season. However, he suffered an arm injury during practice and was waived shortly afterwards. He signed a one-year contract with LegADue's A. S. Monferrato Casale. Katelynas averaged his personal best – 12.7 ppg, 8.2 rpg, 1.4 spg while shooting 56% from the field. During the summer of 2007, he participated in Golden State Warriors summer camp. He signed a one-year contract with Armani Jeans Milano in 2007, and extended it to two years in 2008. He was lent to Meridiano Alicante for the 2009–10 season. In August 2010, he signed a two-year contract with Cajasol Sevilla. In August 2011 he moved back to his homeland, signing a three-year deal with BC Lietuvos Rytas. He left the team in August 2013 and signed with the Turkish team Trabzonspor. He terminated the contract with the team in November.

Career statistics

Euroleague

|-
| style="text-align:left;"| 2007–08
| style="text-align:left;"| AJ Milano
| 11 || 2 || 10.2 || .520 || .333 || .500 || 2.8 || .5 || .5 || .0 || 3.7 || 4.0
|-
| style="text-align:left;"| 2008–09
| style="text-align:left;"| AJ Milano
| 16 || 0 || 14.4 || .513 || .286 || .619 || 3.4 || .8 || .4 || .2 || 4.1 || 4.6
|-
| style="text-align:left;"| 2012–13
| style="text-align:left;"| Lietuvos Rytas
| 10 || 10 || 22.2 || .395 || .350 || .750 || 4.4 || .6 || .5 || .4 || 7.0 || 6.2

National team 
Katelynas was a candidate for the Lithuania national basketball team for Eurobasket 2009, but did not make the final roster. He was a candidate for 2010 FIBA World Championship, but was forced to leave the training camp after suffering a tarsal injury.

References

External links
 Euroleague.net profile

1983 births
Living people
A.S. Junior Pallacanestro Casale players
BC Rytas players
Brose Bamberg players
CB Lucentum Alicante players
Chattanooga Mocs men's basketball players
Liga ACB players
Lithuanian expatriate basketball people in Germany
Lithuanian expatriate basketball people in Italy
Lithuanian expatriate basketball people in Spain
Lithuanian expatriate basketball people in Turkey
Lithuanian expatriate basketball people in the United States
Lithuanian men's basketball players
Olimpia Milano players
Pallacanestro Cantù players
Power forwards (basketball)
Real Betis Baloncesto players
Sportspeople from Alytus
Trabzonspor B.K. players
Utah State Eastern Golden Eagles men's basketball players